The Team large hill took place on 2 March 2013, Austria won, ahead of Germany and Poland.

The Austrian win was almost jeopardized by a ski malfunction in Manuel Fettner's second jump. His right ski unclipped during the landing, but Fettner managed to stay upright until he passed the fall line and Austria kept their lead. It is the first time someone managed this in a World Championship. The time between the end of the competition and the flower ceremony was chaotic due to a point reduction given to Norway, which initially was declared silver medalists. The reason for the point deduction was a human error done by the start gate official who moved the start gate up instead of down, as the Norwegian coach requested, on Anders Bardal's first jump.

Results
The final was started at 16:30.

References

FIS Nordic World Ski Championships 2013